Paysonia lescurii is a species of flowering plant in the family Brassicaceae known by the common names Lescur's bladderpod or Nashville mustard. It is native to Middle Tennessee, where it can be found in wet fields, lawns, and roadsides. It is also present in neighboring areas of Kentucky and Alabama.

Description
The stems are branched from the base and densely hairy. The smaller stem leaves are alternate, simple, and toothed to shallowly lobed with clasping bases.

References

External links
 

lescurii
Flora of Alabama
Flora of Kentucky
Flora of Tennessee
Endemic flora of the United States
Taxa named by Asa Gray
Taxa named by Sereno Watson
Plants described in 1856